Carminatia alvarezii is a rare Mexican species of annual plants in the family Asteraceae. It has been found only in the state of Guerrero.

References 

Eupatorieae
Plants described in 2009
Flora of Guerrero